Wazir Bagh (Pashto, Urdu: وزير باغ) is an 18th century garden in Peshawar, Pakistan.

Overview & history 
It was built by Sardar Fateh Mohammad Khan Barkzai alias Wazir during the rule of the Durrani ruler Prince Shah Mahmood Durrani. Sardar Fateh Mohammad Khan after toppling the rule of Shah Shuja in Peshawar, laid the foundation of this huge garden in 1810. The garden consists of four enclosures and has a pavilion, mosque, football ground, two spacious lawns, pond along with fountains, and old trees planted in it.

Together with Shahi Bagh, Wazir Bagh is considered one of the oldest and largest gardens in Peshawar. They both hold a great historical value for the people and the region. According to old accounts, the garden was full of apricots, peaches, pomegranates, pears and colorful flowers. English envoy Sir Alexander Burnes rested in the garden during his trip in 1832.

The garden holds a significant historical value, it however has lost its fabulous touch due to growing population and local people having less awareness of the historical heritage. It's almost deserted now, its greenery is dying, and is surrounded by newly built buildings.

It was used as a picnic spot in the past and especially its Peepal trees were considered its beauty. Much of the garden's beauty is now destroyed and social activists have many times raised concerns over it. But now this garden is widely used by children and youngsters to play tennis ball cricket on it. Many cricket tournaments are also arranged here in Ramazan.

In 2020, the KPK government started refurbishing work in Wazir Bagh and allocated Rs.100 million under Peshawar revival plan.

See also 
 Shahi Bagh Peshawar
 Army Stadium Peshawar
 Jinnah Park Peshawar

References 

Peshawar
Buildings and structures in Peshawar
Tourist attractions in Peshawar